Knute Rockne, All American is a 1940 American biographical film that tells the story of Knute Rockne, Notre Dame's legendary football coach. It stars Pat O'Brien as Rockne and Ronald Reagan as player George Gipp, as well as Gale Page, Donald Crisp, Albert Bassermann, Owen Davis Jr., Nick Lukats, Kane Richmond, William Marshall and William Byrne. The film also includes cameos by legendary football coaches "Pop" Warner, Amos Alonzo Stagg, William H. Spaulding and Howard Jones, playing themselves.

Reagan's presidential campaign revived interest in the film, and as a result, some reporters called him the Gipper.

The movie was written by Robert Buckner and directed by Lloyd Bacon, who replaced William K. Howard after filming had begun. In 1997, the film was deemed "culturally, historically, or aesthetically significant" by the United States Library of Congress and selected for preservation in the National Film Registry.

Plot
Lars Knutson Rockne, a carriage builder, moves his family from Norway in 1892, settling in Chicago. His son, Knute, saves up his money and enrolls in college at the Notre Dame campus in South Bend, Indiana, where he plays football.

Rockne and teammate Gus Dorais star in Notre Dame's historic 35–13 upset over Army at West Point in 1913. The game is historically significant as Notre Dame employed the seldom-used forward pass to great effect. The publicity from the Fighting Irish's surprise win creates Notre Dame football fans around the country.

After graduation, Rockne marries his sweetheart Bonnie Skiles and stays on at Notre Dame to teach chemistry, work on synthetic rubber in the chemistry lab (under Father Julius Nieuwland) and, in his spare time, serve as an assistant coach of the Fighting Irish football team under head coach Jesse Harper.

Outstanding freshman halfback George Gipp leads the Irish to greater gridiron glory. Gipp is stricken with a fatal illness after the final game of the 1920 season, and on his death bed, he encourages Rockne to someday tell the team to "win one for the Gipper."

Notre Dame continues its football success with a backfield of stars dubbed the Four Horsemen. Rockne is killed in a 1931 plane crash on a trip to California, but his legend makes him a campus immortal.

Cast

 Pat O'Brien as Knute Rockne
 Gale Page as Bonnie Skiles Rockne
 Ronald Reagan as George Gipp
 Donald Crisp as Father John Cavanaugh
 Albert Bassermann as Father Julius Nieuwland
 John Litel as Committee Chairman
 Henry O'Neill as Doctor
 Owen Davis Jr. as Gus Dorais
 John Qualen as Lars Knutson Rockne
 Dorothy Tree as Martha Rockne
 Johnny Sheffield as Knute, age 7
 Howard Jones as Himself
 Glenn "Pop" Warner as Himself
 Alonzo Stagg as Himself
 William "Bill" Spaulding as Himself
 Kane Richmond as Elmer Layden
 William Marshall as Don Miller
 William Byrne as Jim Crowley
 Nick Lukats as Harry Stuhldreher. Also a technical advisor for the film

Reception
Bosley Crowther of The New York Times called the film "one of the best pictures for boys in years" and wrote that O'Brien conveyed "a valid impression of an iron-willed, dynamic and cryptic fellow who could very well be 'Rock.' As a memorial to a fine and inspiring molder of character in young men, this picture ranks high. But, like the Carnegie Foundation has done on previous occasions, we are inclined to question its overemphasis of the pigskin sport."

Variety called the film "one of the best biographical picturizations ever turned out ... Pat O'Brien delivers a fine characterization of the immortal Rockne, catching the spirit of the role with an understanding of the human qualities of the man."

Film Daily wrote: "Pat O'Brien's life-like Rockne is brilliantly delineated; it's as though Rockne himself were striding across the field once more."

Harrison's Reports wrote: "Very good! It is the first football picture produced without any 'hokum'; it shows how teams are developed and what the game means to both players and coach ... The football scenes should prove thrilling to all."

John Mosher of The New Yorker wrote that the story had been "suitably handled for its public of energetic young people and South Bend alumni."

The film is recognized by American Film Institute in these lists:
 2005: AFI's 100 Years ... 100 Movie Quotes:
 Knute Rockne: "Tell 'em to go out there with all they got and win just one for the Gipper." – #89
 2006: AFI's 100 Years ... 100 Cheers – Nominated
 2008: AFI's 10 Top 10:	
 Nominated Sports Film

"Win one for the Gipper"

This quote is ranked No. 89 in the AFI's 100 Years...100 Movie Quotes poll. However, for many years during which United Artists held the rights, the Gipper sequence was cut for television showings. For the film's initial release to home video, MGM/UA restored the sequence as part of the original uncut version, and this is the version that has been used for all home video, television and theatrical reissues since.

The phrase "win one for the Gipper" was later used as a political slogan by Ronald Reagan, who was often referred to as the Gipper because he had played the role of George Gipp in Knute Rockne, All American. At the 1988 Republican National Convention, Reagan told his vice president George H. W. Bush, "George, go out there and win one for the Gipper." Bob Dole used the phrase at the 1996 Republican National Convention, as did President George W. Bush at the 2004 Republican National Convention in his acceptance speech when he stated "We can now truly win one for the Gipper" shortly after Reagan's death.

The line is spoken by the dying pilot Al Ross in the 1964 film Flight to Fury.

The speech is parodied in the film Airplane!, which was released when Reagan was running for the presidency in 1980.

Historical accuracy
Neither Notre Dame nor the NCAA recognizes Knute Rockne as a (first team) All-American.

Knute Rockne gives the famous "win one for the Gipper," speech at halftime of the 1930 game during his final championship season, but the speech was actually given at halftime of the 1928 game during a season in which Notre Dame finished with a 5-4 record.

See also
 Ronald Reagan filmography
 Jack Chevigny

References

External links

Knute Rockne, All American essay by Daniel Eagan in America's Film Legacy: The Authoritative Guide to the Landmark Movies in the National Film Registry, Bloomsbury Academic, 2010 , pages 318-320 

1940 films
1940s biographical drama films
1940s sports films
American biographical drama films
American football films
Biographical films about sportspeople
Biographical films about educators
American black-and-white films
Films directed by Lloyd Bacon
Films set in Indiana
Films set in universities and colleges
Notre Dame Fighting Irish football
Sports films based on actual events
United States National Film Registry films
Warner Bros. films
Films directed by William K. Howard
Films scored by Heinz Roemheld
Cultural depictions of players of American football
Cultural depictions of American men
1940 drama films
1940s English-language films
1940s American films